Burstead Grange was a priory in Essex, England.

References

Monasteries in Essex